The 2000 Gelsor Open Romania was a men's tennis tournament played on outdoor clay courts at the Arenele BNR in Bucharest in Romania and was part of the International Series of the 2000 ATP Tour. It was the eighth and final edition of the tournament and was held from 11 September through 17 September 2000. Unseeded Joan Balcells won the singles title.

Singles main draw entrants

Seeds 

 1 Rankings were as of August 28, 2000.

Other entrants  
The following players received wildcards into the singles main draw:
  Ionuț Moldovan
  Dinu Pescariu
  Răzvan Sabău

The following players received entry from the qualifying draw:
  Marc-Kevin Goellner
  Jakub Herm-Zahlava
  Michael Kohlmann
  Alexandre Simoni

Doubles main draw entrants

Seeds 

 Rankings were as of August 28, 2000.

Other entrants 
The following pairs received wildcards into the doubles main draw:
  Ionuț Moldovan /  Dinu Pescariu
  Gabriel Moraru /  Serguei Novosselov
  Sándor Noszály /  Răzvan Sabău

Finals

Singles

 Joan Balcells defeated  Markus Hantschk 6–4, 3–6, 7–6(7–1)
 It was Balcells' only title of the year and also of his career.

Doubles

 Alberto Martín /  Eyal Ran defeated  Devin Bowen /  Mariano Hood 7–6(7–4), 6–1
 It was Martín's only title of the year and the 3rd of his career (singles and doubles combined). It was Ran's only title of the year and the also of his career.

References

External links
 ITF tournament edition details

Gelsor Open Romania
Romanian Open
2000 in Romanian tennis
September 2000 sports events in Europe